Cape Verde competed at the 2020 Summer Olympics in Tokyo. Originally scheduled to take place from 24 July to 9 August 2020, the Games were postponed to 23 July to 8 August 2021, due to the COVID-19 pandemic. This was the nation's seventh appearance at the Olympics, since its debut in 1996.

Competitors
The following is the list of number of competitors in the Games.

Athletics

Cape Verde received a universality slot from the World Athletics to send a male athlete to the Olympics.

Track & road events

Boxing

Cape Verde received an invitation from the Tripartite Commission and the IOC Boxing Task Force group to send the men's flyweight boxer David Daniel de Pina to the Olympics.

Gymnastics

Rhythmic 
Cape Verde received an invitation from the Tripartite Commission to send a rhythmic gymnast in the individual all-around competition to the Olympics.

Judo

Cape Verde qualified one judoka for the women's half-middleweight category (63 kg) at the Games. Sandrine Billiet accepted a continental berth from Africa as the nation's top-ranked judoka outside of direct qualifying position in the IJF World Ranking List of June 28, 2021.

Swimming

For the first time in history, Cape Verde received a universality invitation from FINA to send two top-ranked swimmers (one per gender) in their respective individual events to the Olympics, based on the FINA Points System of June 28, 2021.

References

External links
 Cape Verde at the 2020 Summer Olympics at Olympedia

Nations at the 2020 Summer Olympics
2020